Unelectric is an unplugged album by Joy Electric. It mainly features acoustic versions of Joy Electric songs from previous albums, with the exception of "These Should Be The Good Times" and "Losing Touch With Everyone" which were new songs recorded only for Unelectric.

Track listing
"Monosynth"  – 4:37
"True Harmony"  – 2:34
"Disco for a Ride"  – 4:43
"These Should Be the Good Times"  – 3:59
"The Girl From Rosewood Lane"  – 2:59
"The North Sea"  – 4:28
"Sugar Rush"  – 3:13
"The Cobbler"  – 4:22
"Candy Cane Carriage"  – 3:55
"Losing Touch with Everyone"  – 2:09

References 

Joy Electric albums
2000 albums
Tooth & Nail Records albums